Stepping Stones: Live at the Village Vanguard is a live album led by trumpeter Woody Shaw which was recorded at the Village Vanguard in 1978 and released on the Columbia label in 1979.

Stepping Stones: Live at the Village Vanguard was reissued by Legacy Recordings in 2005. The re-release was produced by Shaw's producer Michael Cuscuna and Shaw's son Woody Louis Armstrong Shaw III, both of whom contributed new liner notes along with Shaw's long-time trombonist Steve Turre. The reissue was remastered by engineer Mark Wilder.

Reception

Scott Yanow of Allmusic stated "the band sounds technically and creatively inspired... Shaw pushed those innovations as far as they could go. Few have come close to approaching his artistry and cerebral architecture and none have gone past it. Stepping Stones: Live at the Village Vanguard captures that artistry in motion".

Track listing 
All compositions by Woody Shaw except as indicated
 "Stepping Stone" - 9:12
 "In a Capricornian Way" - 11:16
 "Seventh Avenue" (Victor Lewis) - 8:35 
 "All Things Being Equal Are Not" (Onaje Allan Gumbs) - 12:04  *
 "Escape Velocity" (Clint Houston) - 11:14  **
 "Blues for Ball" (McCoy Tyner) - 17:12  *
 "Theme for Maxine" - 1:00

*Released on the 2005 reissue by Sony Legacy and in 2011 on Woody Shaw: The Complete Columbia Albums Collection .

**Originally released on Shaw's 1979 Columbia album Woody III.

Reissue Bonus Tracks 
Stepping Stones: Live at the Village Vanguard was reissued on Woody Shaw: The Complete Columbia Albums Collection in 2011.  An additional CD titled "Stepping Stones Bonus Tracks" was included:
 "It All Comes Back to You" (Onaje Allen Gumbs) - 10:14
 "Watership Down" (Clint Houston) - 13:48
 "Solar" (Miles Davis) - 16:20
 "On Green Dolphin Street" (Bronisław Kaper, Ned Washington) - 16:01
 "Days of Wine and Roses" (Henry Mancini, Johnny Mercer) - 13:40

Personnel 
Woody Shaw - cornet, flugelhorn
Carter Jefferson - tenor saxophone, soprano saxophone
Onaje Allan Gumbs - piano
Clint Houston - bass
Victor Lewis - drums

References 

Woody Shaw live albums
1978 live albums
Columbia Records live albums
Albums produced by Michael Cuscuna
Albums recorded at the Village Vanguard